Mr Joe B. Carvalho is a Bollywood comedy film which released on 3 January 2014. The film is directed by Samir Tewari, and produced by Shital Malviya and Bhola Ram Malviya (Arshad Warsi's long standing secretary). The film stars Arshad Warsi, Soha Ali Khan, Javed Jaffrey and Vijay Raaz. The first teaser of the film was released on 17 November 2013. The film also has guest appearances by Geeta Basra, Mahika Sharma and Karishma Kotak. Singer Babul Supriyo debuts in the film by playing a cameo.
The movie's title itself is a word play for the Hindi phrase Jo bhi karwa lo (translated as "Get anything done").

Plot
Mr Joe B. Carvalho (Arshad Warsi) is your (slightly below) average corny-go-lucky private eye in the quest for a truly challenging case that can bring in money and fame and change his fortunes for good. A moneyed Khurana (Shakti Kapoor) hands him a case to find his eloped daughter.

Meanwhile, Joe's ex-girlfriend Inspector Shantipriya Phadnis (Soha Ali Khan) is chasing an international criminal Carlos (Jaaved Jaffrey) a lollypop-sucking international terrorist who is in town with a big murder plot. A local underworld don MK (Vijay Raaz) has been roped in to help Carlos but with intentions of killing him.

The detective-inspector-don ends up in the terrorist's hotel room and Joe is mistaken as Carlos. Both MK and Shantipriya are now on his trail, whereas clueless Joe ends up spying on a wrong girl.

Cast
 Arshad Warsi as Joe B. Carvalho
 Soha Ali Khan as Inspector ShantiPriya Fadnis
 Jaaved Jaffrey as Carlos
 Virendra Saxena as Naidu
 Vijay Raaz as Monty Kalra
 Shakti Kapoor as Khurana
 Vrajesh Hirjee as Hira
 Rajesh Balwani as Moti
 Geeta Basra as Gehna
 Karishma Kotak as Neena
 Ranjeet as Anil Virani
 Himani Shivpuri as Joe's mother
 Manoj Joshi as Commissioner Pandey
 Snehal Dhabi as General Kopa Bhalerao Kabana
 Kunal Khemu in a Cameo Appearance
 Mahika Sharma in a Cameo Appearance
 Babul Supriyo as Malik
 Chitra Shenoy as Sundari

Production

The film's producers, Bholaram and Shital Malviya, invited directors Rohit Shetty, Subhash Kapoor and Indra Kumar to unveil the first teaser look of the film in Mumbai on 16 November 2013. The first look of the film was unveiled on 2 November 2013. Arshad Warsi plays a detective and Soha Ali Khan plays the role of a police officer. Soha learnt martial arts for her role. Ajay Bagdai bought the all-India distribution rights of the film. The theatrical trailer of film was unveiled on the show Bigg Boss on 24 November 2013.

Filming
Soha Ali Khan wore a bikini for the first time on-screen in this Bollywood film. The film was shot in Goa, Mumbai and Bangalore. Arshad Warsi also choreographed one of his own songs in the film. Soha also performed a cabaret in the film. Jaaved Jaaferi's character's name is 'Carlos' and he sported quirky looks each time he comes on screen. Some of them are that of an Afro man, a blonde woman, a sadhu baba and a Maharashtrian woman. Kunal Khemu did a special appearance in the film.

Marketing
Arshad Warsi and Soha Ali Khan promoted the film on Bigg Boss 7, during its trailer release. Arshad and Soha also promoted the film on Comedy Nights with Kapil.

Soundtrack

Shefali Alvares sung an item number for the film, composed by Amartya Bobo Rahut. Amitabh Bhattacharya, Virag Mishra have written the lyrics for the film. The entire soundtrack for the film composed by Amartya Bobo Rahut was released on the digital music platform iTunes on 6 December 2013 consisting of 5 tracks.

Box office
The film grossed around Rs 22.5 million nett over the first weekend. The film went down on Monday with collections around 30–35 million nett. Thus the film, made on a budget of around Rs 15 million, more or less managed to recover its money.

See also
 List of Bollywood films of 2014

References

External links

2010s Hindi-language films
2014 films
Indian comedy films
Films shot in Goa
Films shot in Mumbai
2014 comedy films